"Automatic High" is a song by British pop group S Club Juniors, released as the second single from their debut album, Together (2002). Released on 22 July 2002, the song peaked at number two on the UK Singles Chart, becoming their second single to reach the position.

Composition

Stacey McClean sings the first verse, the second part of the third verse, part of the song's bridge and backing vocals in the end of the song. Daisy Evans sings the second verse and part of the song's bridge. Frankie Sandford sings the solo's parts in every chorus and backing vocals in the end of the song. Rochelle Wiseman sings the first part of the third verse. Calvin Goldspink, Aaron Renfree, Hannah Richings and Jay Asforis do not have any solos in this song.

Track listings

UK CD1
 "Automatic High"
 "Anytime Anywhere"
 "Anytime Anywhere" (S Club 7 version)
 "Automatic High" (video)

UK CD2
 "Automatic High"
 "Automatic High" (karaoke version)
 "We Got You"

UK cassette single
 "Automatic High"
 "Anytime Anywhere"
 "Anytime Anywhere" (S Club 7 version)

Credits and personnel
Credits are lifted from the Together album booklet.

Studio
 Mastered at Transfermation (London, England)

Personnel
 Jewels & Stone – writing, production, vocal production and arrangement
 Terry Ronald – writing, vocal production and arrangement
 Nina Madhoo – writing
 James Nisbet – guitar
 Richard Dowling – mastering

Charts

Weekly charts

Year-end charts

Certifications

References

S Club 8 songs
19 Recordings singles
2002 singles
2002 songs
Polydor Records singles
Songs written by Julian Gingell